Masjid al-Ikhlas (Arabic: "mosque of devotion"), also referred to as The Islamic Learning Center of Orange County,  is a mosque in Newburgh, New York.

Formerly a warehouse, the mosque was founded in 1992. Previously, Newburgh's Muslim community met in town's NAACP office or a local store front.

As of 2009, the imam was Salahuddin Mustafa Muhammad.

Expansion
In 2005, the mosque began an expansion project to accommodate the growing Muslim population of the Hudson Valley. When the mosque opened in 1992, its membership was an estimated 50 families, but growing to nearly 500 members, the mosque could no longer hold support its growing congregations. Costs were reportedly being covered by donations from mosque members and the community.

2009 Bronx terrorism plot controversy
The mosque came to national attention when it was revealed that it had been regularly attended by four men who were arrested in the 2009 Bronx terrorism plot, a plan, stopped by the FBI,  to shoot down military planes at an Air National Guard base in Newburgh and blow up two synagogues in the Riverdale neighborhood of New York City.

Shahed Hussain, an  Albany hotel owner now known to have been an FBI informant,  regularly attended  the mosque, approaching congregants in the parking lot after Friday services and talking of jihad and violence. Members of the congregation interviewed after the terror plot was exposed stated that "most" members of the congregation had believed Hussain to be an informant.  None had reported his talk about Jihad to the authorities.

See also
  List of mosques in the Americas
  Lists of mosques 
  List of mosques in the United States

References

Mosques in New York (state)
Newburgh, New York
1992 establishments in New York (state)